Holcopogon is a genus of gelechioid moths. It is the type genus of the subfamily Holcopogoninae, which is mostly placed within the concealer moth family Autostichidae.

The type species was designated as H. helveolellus, but this turned out to be a junior synonym of H. bubulcellus. Some authors have thus erroneously assumed the latter taxon to be the genus' type. Cyrnia is sometimes listed as a distinct genus, but its type species (Cyrnia barbata) is generally assumed to be another junior synonym of H. bubulcellus. Thus, Cyrnia is a junior subjective synonym of Holcopogon.

The species of Holcopogon are:
 Holcopogon bubulcellus (Staudinger, 1859)
 Holcopogon cinerascens Turati, 1926
 Holcopogon croesus Gozmány, 2000
 Holcopogon glaserorum Gozmany, 1985
 Holcopogon robustus (Butler, 1883)
 Holcopogon scaeocentra Meyrick, 1921
 Holcopogon tucki Vives Moreno, 1999

References

Further reading
 Fauna Europaea (2009): Holcopogon. Version 2.1, 2009-DEC-22. Retrieved 2010-APR-30.
  (2004a): Butterflies and Moths of the World, Generic Names and their Type-species – Cyrnia. Version of 2004-NOV-05. Retrieved 2010-APR-30.
 Pitkin, Brian & Jenkins, Paul (2004b): Butterflies and Moths of the World, Generic Names and their Type-species – Holcopogon. Version of 2004-NOV-05. Retrieved 2010-APR-30.

External links
 Images representing  Holcopogon at Consortium for the Barcode of Life

 
Holcopogoninae